The Institute of Public Administration (IPA) is a recognised college of the National University of Ireland. It was founded in 1957 at a meeting in Newman House where Tom Barrington became the first director and John Leydon its first president. It was established to be the main provider of education, training and development services for the public service in Ireland, as well as research services. Until 2018 it was a recognized college of University College Dublin.

The Whitaker School of Government and Management brings the IPA’s education and research activities together,  and offers more than 30 qualifications accredited by University College Dublin. Named after the public servant and economist T. K. Whitaker, one of Ireland’s most eminent public servants, the School provides a wide range of part-time third-level programmes in, among other areas, public management, local government, healthcare management, HRM, finance, and business studies. These programmes have flexible delivery methods and are of different duration. They have long proved popular with those who want to obtain a high-level qualification while attending to their work and domestic obligations.

References

Universities and colleges in the Republic of Ireland
National University of Ireland
1957 establishments in Ireland
Local government in the Republic of Ireland